Latvia competed at the 2014 Summer Youth Olympics, in Nanjing, China from 16 August to 28 August 2014.

Medalists

Athletics

Latvia qualified four athletes.

Qualification Legend: Q=Final A (medal); qB=Final B (non-medal); qC=Final C (non-medal); qD=Final D (non-medal); qE=Final E (non-medal)

Boys
Track & road events

Field Events

Girls
Field events

Beach Volleyball

Latvia qualified a team by being the highest ranked nation not yet qualified.

Modern Pentathlon

Latvia qualified one athlete based on the 1 June 2014 Olympic Youth A Pentathlon World Rankings.

Sailing

Latvia was given a reallocation boat based on being a top ranked nation not yet qualified.

Shooting

Latvia qualified one shooter based on its performance at the 2014 European Shooting Championships.

Individual

Team

Swimming

Latvia qualified two swimmers.

Boys

Girls

Tennis

Latvia qualified one athlete based on the 9 June 2014 ITF World Junior Rankings.

Singles

Doubles

Weightlifting

Latvia was given a reallocation spot to compete.

Girls

References

2014 in Latvian sport
Nations at the 2014 Summer Youth Olympics
Latvia at the Youth Olympics